Sylvia Sabine Jörrißen (born 29 November 1967 in Oberhausen) is a German politician and a member of the Christian Democratic Union or CDU. In the parliamentary election in 2013 she was elected as a member of the German Bundestag. She is Protestant, married and a mother of three. Professionally Jörrißen is a certified banking specialist.

Education 

Between 1974 and 1978 she attended primary school in Meerbusch, Herford and Hamm, between 1978 and 1987 she attended Hammonense academic secondary school in Hamm and obtained Abitur (higher-education entrance qualification). In 1987 she began a two-year training as a bank clerk at the Hamm branch of Deutsche Bank, where she got her diploma as a banking specialist. From 1989 to 1993 she worked in the Deutsche Bank cross-regional support association for loans and business customers in Hamm and Osnabrück, 1991-1992 she studied part-time at Bankakademie in Dortmund whilst working, between 1993 and 1998 she was on maternity leave and had a career break to raise children. Since 2003 she has been working as a freelance real property manager.

Political career 

Jörrißen joined the Christian Democratic Union in 2003 and from 2004 to 2013 she was a member of the Hamm-Heessen district council. Since 2004 she has also been a member of the executive committee of the Hamm county branch of Women´s Union; since 2005 a member of the local Heessen branch of the CDU and since 2007 its vice-chairwoman. Between 2008 and 2013 she was a chairwoman of the district council in Heessen and since 2009 a member of the executive committee of the Hamm county branch of the CDU.

Bundestag 

In the Bundestag election in 2013 Sylvia Jörrißen competed as a direct member for the constituency 145 Hamm-Unna II, however she entered the German Bundestag via the North Rhine-Westphalia list of state candidates. She is a member of the Committee on the Environment, Building, Nature Conservation and Nuclear Safety and a deputy member of two further committees on Legal Affairs and Consumer Protection Committee and on Transport and Digital Infrastructure.

Activities 

Since 2004 she is a member of the association supporting Hammonense academic secondary school; since 2011 she is also a founding member and director of the association supporting Oberwerries Manor.

Private 

Sylvia Jörrißen is married with the manager of the construction company HGB in Hamm, Thomas Jörrißen and lives with her family in Hamm-Heessen. Her father, Norwin Wegner, was a city councilor from the Free Democratic Party (FDP) for many years. Jörrißen is a fan of the football club FC Schalke 04.

References 

 Sylvia Jörrißen´s Homepage

1967 births
Living people
People from Oberhausen
Members of the Bundestag 2013–2017
Members of the Bundestag for North Rhine-Westphalia
Members of the Bundestag for the Christian Democratic Union of Germany